Collingham is a civil parish in the metropolitan borough of the City of Leeds, West Yorkshire, England.  It contains eight listed buildings that are recorded in the National Heritage List for England.  Of these, one is listed at Grade II*, the middle of the three grades, and the others are at Grade II, the lowest grade.  The parish contains the villages of Collingham and Linton, and the surrounding countryside.  The listed buildings consist of a church, two farmhouses, a barn, an outbuilding, two bridges, and a milestone.


Key

Buildings

References

Citations

Sources

 

Lists of listed buildings in West Yorkshire